The Macon Trax were a minor-league professional ice hockey team based in Macon, Georgia.  They played in the low minor leagues Atlantic Coast Hockey League (2002–03), World Hockey Association 2 (2003–04) and Southern Professional Hockey League (2004–05), playing their home games at the Macon Coliseum.  The team went to the championship finals in both the WHA2 and the SPHL, losing in each series to the league champion.  This history prompted head coach Tommy Stewart to tell the Macon Telegraph that the team was "always a bridesmaid, never a bride."

The Trax were one of eight minor league hockey teams purchased or founded by real estate mogul David Waronker starting in 2003.  By January 2007 all but one of those teams had ceased operations.  Following the termination of the Trax in 2005, the team's players were dispersed by draft to the Pee Dee Cyclones and Florida Seals, two new teams entering the SPHL for the 2005–06 season.  Stewart was given a coaching contract with the Florida team, which lost in the 2006 SPHL finals. The Seals would later suspend operations in January 2007.

Nearly a decade after the Trax folded, the SPHL returned to Macon during the 2015–16 season. The new team, the Macon Mayhem, was formerly known as the Augusta RiverHawks. The RiverHawks relocated to Macon after the ice refrigeration system at the James Brown Arena malfunctioned in late February 2013, forcing the team to suspend its operations.

2004-2005 season roster
 Tom Wilson
 Lou Dimasi
 Chris Davidson
 Art Mnatsakanov
 Bob Macmillan
 Chris Duggan
 Steve Zoryk
 Craig Miller
 Jeff Roukes
 Mark Allen
 John Gurskis
 Edan Welch
 Dominik Dawes
 Casey Handrahan
 Craig Geerlinks
 Mark Cairns
 Ryan Rivard
 David Deeves
 Terry Denike

References

Defunct Southern Professional Hockey League teams
Defunct ice hockey teams in the United States
Ice hockey clubs established in 2002
Ice hockey clubs disestablished in 2005
Ice hockey teams in Georgia (U.S. state)
Sports in Macon, Georgia
Atlantic Coast Hockey League (2002–03) teams
World Hockey Association 2 teams
2002 establishments in Georgia (U.S. state)
2005 disestablishments in Georgia (U.S. state)